Edgar Holmes Adams (April 7, 1868 – May 5, 1940) was an American competition diver and swimmer, numismatic scholar, author, coin collector and dealer.

Swimming
He represented the United States at the 1904 Summer Olympics in St. Louis, Missouri, where he won a silver medal in the men's plunge for distance event, finishing behind compatriot William Dickey.  Competing in the swimming events at the 1904 Summer Olympics, he finished fourth in the 220-yard freestyle, 880-yard freestyle, and the 4×50-yard freestyle relay.  He also competed in the one-mile freestyle but did not finish the race.

Numismatics
Adams was a prolific numismatic author who coauthored, with William H. Woodin United States Pattern, Trial, and Experimental Pieces, but is probably best known for the reference volume Private Gold Coinages of California, 1849-1855: Its History and Its Issues, originally published serially (1911-1912) in the American Journal of Numismatics.

He wrote a numismatics column for the New York Sun. From 1912 to 1915 he served as editor of the American Numismatic Association journal The Numismatist.

He was inducted into the Numismatic Hall of Fame in 1969.

Publications by Adams
Adams' Official Premium List of United States Private and Territorial Gold Coins Indicated by Prices Brought at Public Coin Sales. New York: Willett Press, 1909.
The State Assay Office of California. 1850. (Private Gold Coinage I). New York: American Numismatic Society, 1911.
Private Gold Coinage of California, 1849-55, Its History and Its Issues. New York, Edgar H. Adams, 1913. 
United States Pattern, Trial and Experimental Pieces: Being a List of the Pattern, Trial and Experimental Pieces Which Have Been Issued By the United States Mint from 1792 Up to the Present Time. New York, American Numismatic Society, 1913.
United States Store Cards. New York: E.H. Adams and W. Raymond, 1920.

References

External links
 
 Biography of Edgar Adams from Encyclopedic Dictionary of Numismatic Biographies
 Newman Numismatic Portal

1868 births
1940 deaths
American male freestyle swimmers
Divers at the 1904 Summer Olympics
American male divers
Olympic silver medalists for the United States in diving
Olympic swimmers of the United States
Swimmers at the 1904 Summer Olympics
American numismatists
Academic journal editors
People from Bayville, New York
Medalists at the 1904 Summer Olympics